Myeik (or ; , ; , , ; formerly Mergui) is a rural city in Tanintharyi Region in Myanmar (Burma), located in the extreme south of the country on the coast off an island on the Andaman Sea. , the estimated population was over 209,000. Myeik is the largest city in Tanintharyi Region, and serves as the  regional headquarters of Myanmar Navy's Tanintharyi Regional Command. The area inland from the city is a major smuggling corridor into Thailand. The Singkhon Pass, also known as the Maw-daung Pass, has an international cross-border checkpoint.

History
Myeik was the southernmost part of the Pagan Kingdom between the 11th and 13th centuries. After the Pagan Empire's collapse in 1287, Myeik became part of successive Thai kingdoms from the late 13th century to the middle of 18th century: first the Sukhothai Kingdom and later the Ayutthaya Kingdom. A brief period of Burmese rule interrupted this between 1564 and 1593.

From the 16th century on, the city was an important seaport and trading center with the Europeans, who would land at Mergui, travel upriver to Tenasserim and then cross the mountains to reach Ayutthaya. The French officer Chevalier de Beauregard was made Governor of the city of Myeik after the Anglo-Siamese War (1687) that resulted in the English being expelled from Siam. De Beauregard was named Governor by Narai, the king of the Ayutthaya Kingdom, replacing an Englishman, Samuel White. The French were then expelled from Myeik following the Siamese revolution of 1688.

The Burmese captured Myeik in 1765 as part of an invasion that would ultimately topple the Ayutthaya Kingdom in 1767. In 1826, the Burmese ceded the region to the British after the First Anglo-Burmese War (1824–1826).

In the Pacific Theater of World War II, Imperial Japanese forces used laborers to construct the Mergui Road to aid their retreat after rail line were destroyed by Allied bombings.

Climate
Myeik has a tropical monsoon climate (Köppen climate classification Am) that is hot throughout the year. After a short dry season centred on December and January, there is a long wet season from mid-March to mid-November. Heavy rainfall usually occurs from May to September.

Demographics 
The inhabitants of the city are descended from many ethnic groups, including Burman, Burmese Indian, Burmese Chinese, Karen, Mon, and Moken. They speak a dialect of the Burmese language known as the Myeik dialect. According to the 2014 census, Myeik has a total population of 284,498.

Attractions 
Myeik is home to notable several Burmese pagodas, the largest of which is the Theindawgyi Pagoda and Paw Daw Mu Pagoda is famous too.

Economy 

The population is primarily engaged in resource extraction industries like fishing, the production of natural rubber and coconuts, the collection of edible bird's nests, and pearl farming. Seafood products like dried fish, dried prawn and ngapi (shrimp paste) are other industries. Myeik is a gateway to the 800 offshore islands of the Mergui Archipelago, which are developing a tourist trade. Tourism in the area is currently restricted to cruises, as land based accommodations are currently non-existent on the islands.

Education
 No.1 Basic Education High School
 Myeik University
 Technological University, Myeik
 Computer University, Myeik

Health care
 Myeik Public Hospital (12.462990, 98.611030)
 Datkhina Dipar Hospital (12.444978, 98.610848)
 Myint Mo Hospital
 Taw Win Hospital
 Shwe Tara Phu Hospital

Security
 Myeik Police Station (12.437512, 98.598449)

Notable residents
 Htay Myint
 Lwin Moe
 Ngwe Gaing

See also
 Myeik Airport

References

Bibliography

 
 
 Pardieu, Vincent (December 2007) "South Sea Cultured Pearls From Mergui, Burma (Myanmar)"

https://mergui-entertainment.business.site==External links==
 Myeik Walking Tour - a free, bilingual guide to Myeik's architecture and history
 Helfer in the Islands - the journal and routes of Dr. Johann W. Helfer, who explored the Mergui Archipelago in 1838-9

Populated places in Tanintharyi Region
Township capitals of Myanmar
Myeik Township